= Alan Bartram (design writer) =

British graphic designer

Alan Bartram (1932 – 2013) was a British graphic designer and historian of design and lettering.

== Career ==
Bartram studied painting and typography and became a graphic designer, working for Lund Humphries and IBM. He researched the history of British vernacular design and lettering, publishing books on traditional British tombstones, shop and street name lettering as well as on book typography.

While working at Lund Humphries, Bartram worked with James Sutton to make An Atlas of Typeforms. This book was 16 x 10 inches and it was published by Lund Humphries in 1967.

Bartram's series of books on lettering was published by Lund Humphries: Lettering in Architecture, Fascia Lettering in the British Isles, Street Name Lettering in the British Isles, and Tombstone Lettering in the British Isles. The final book, The English Lettering Tradition, was published in 1986. This series is recognized for its illustrations and monochrome photographs done by Bartram.
